Hanafy Bastan (6 January 1922 – 13 November 1995) was an Egyptian former footballer who played as a defender for Zamalek. He also played for the Egyptian national team, and represented his country in the 1948 and 1952 Summer Olympics, and was part of the team that won the 1957 African Cup of Nations.

Honours
Egypt
 Africa Cup of Nations: (1)
 1957

Zamalek SC
Egypt Cup: (7)
 1940–41, 1942–43, 1943–44, 1951–52, 1954–55, 1956–57, 1957–58
Cairo League: (10)
 1939–40, 1940–41, 1943–44, 1944–45, 1945–46, 1946–47, 1948–49, 1950–51, 1951–52, 1952–53

Artistic activity
He appeared at the movie Talk of the City (Hadeeth Al-Madina ) in 1964, and Goodbye forever (Wada'n Ela Al-Abad ) in 1976.

References

External links
 

1922 births
1995 deaths
Footballers from Cairo
Egyptian footballers
Association football defenders
Egypt international footballers
Zamalek SC players
Olympic footballers of Egypt
Footballers at the 1948 Summer Olympics
Footballers at the 1952 Summer Olympics
1957 African Cup of Nations players
Africa Cup of Nations-winning players
1962 African Cup of Nations managers
Mediterranean Games silver medalists for Egypt
Mediterranean Games medalists in football
Footballers at the 1951 Mediterranean Games
Egyptian football managers
20th-century Egyptian people